Kisondela is an administrative ward in the Rungwe district of the Mbeya Region of Tanzania. In 2016 the Tanzania National Bureau of Statistics report there were 12,200 people in the ward, from 11,070 in 2012.

Villages and hamlets 
The ward has 5 villages, and 26 hamlets.

 Bugoba
 Bugoba
 Igembe
 Lusungo chini
 Lusungo juu
 Masebe
 Isuba
 Ilulwe
 Iponjola
 Isuba
 Seso
 katumba
 Kibatata
 Ipyana
 Kililila
 Kisondela
 Lusungo II
 Mwanjelwa
 Ndubi Ndubi
 Lutete
 Bujesi
 Isumba
 Lugombo
 Majengo
 Ngubati
 Njela
 Nnyamisi
 Mpuga
 Mpuga
 Ngopyolo
 Nsyamba

References 

Wards of Mbeya Region